The following highways are numbered 83.

International
 Asian Highway 83
 European route E83

Australia
 Eastern Highway in Melbourne
 B83 Pacific Highway
 Flinders Ranges Way, South Australia
 National Route 83 from Birdsville to Normanton in Queensland

Canada
 Manitoba Highway 83
 Manitoba Highway 83A

India
 National Highway 83 (India)
State Highway 83 (Uttar Pradesh)

Korea, South
National Route 83

New Zealand
  New Zealand State Highway 83

United Kingdom
A83 road (Scotland)

United States
 Interstate 83
 U.S. Route 83
 Alabama State Route 83
 Arizona State Route 83
 California State Route 83
 Colorado State Highway 83
 Connecticut Route 83
 Florida State Road 83
 County Road 83 (Walton County, Florida)
 County Road 83A (Walton County, Florida)
 Georgia State Route 83
 Hawaii Route 83
 Illinois Route 83
 Iowa Highway 83
 Kentucky Route 83
 Louisiana Highway 83
 Maryland Route 83 (former)
 Massachusetts Route 83
 M-83 (Michigan highway)
 Minnesota State Highway 83
 County Road 83 (Scott County, Minnesota)
 Missouri Route 83
 Montana Highway 83
 Nebraska Highway 83 (former)
 New Jersey Route 83
 County Route 83 (Bergen County, New Jersey)
 County Route 83 (Ocean County, New Jersey)
 New Mexico State Road 83
 New York State Route 83
 County Route 83 (Cayuga County, New York)
 County Route 83 (Dutchess County, New York)
 County Route 83A (Dutchess County, New York)
 County Route 83 (Greene County, New York)
 County Route 83 (Madison County, New York)
 County Route 83 (Montgomery County, New York)
 County Route 83 (Niagara County, New York)
 County Route 83 (Onondaga County, New York)
 County Route 83 (Rockland County, New York)
 County Route 83 (Suffolk County, New York)
 County Route 83A (Suffolk County, New York)
 North Carolina Highway 83
 Ohio State Route 83
 Oklahoma State Highway 83
 Pennsylvania Route 83 (former)
 South Carolina Highway 83
 South Dakota Highway 83
 Tennessee State Route 83
 Texas State Highway 83
 Texas State Highway Loop 83
 Farm to Market Road 83
 Utah State Route 83
 Virginia State Route 83
 West Virginia Route 83
 Wisconsin Highway 83

Territories
 U.S. Virgin Islands Highway 83

See also
A83